Norfolk County may refer to:

Norfolk County, Massachusetts, United States
Norfolk County, Ontario, Canada
Norfolk County, Virginia, (defunct)
Norfolk, a county in England
Norfolk, Virginia, an independent city and county-equivalent in Virginia, United States
 "Old" Norfolk County, Massachusetts Colony (extinct)